Wanda De Jesus (born August 26, 1958) is an American actress. She was the fourth actress to portray Santana Andrade in NBC's soap opera Santa Barbara. 
Aside from her work on soap operas, De Jesus appeared in several TV shows in a guest starring role, and she had a recurring role on the CBS crime series CSI: Miami as MDPD Detective Adelle Sevilla. On the week of June 14, 2010, she made her debut on All My Children as Iris Blanco, the mayor of Pine Valley.  In 2010, De Jesus was cast as the head of the police squad on Law & Order: Los Angeles, but the role – which had already been changed significantly before De Jesus joined – was changed again and reshot with a different actress after two episodes had been filmed.

Filmography

Film

Television

Awards and nominations

References

External links
 

1958 births
Actresses from New York City
American film actresses
American soap opera actresses
American television actresses
Living people
People from Manhattan
21st-century American women